The Yana are a group of Native Americans indigenous to Northern California in the central Sierra Nevada, on the western side of the range. Their lands, prior to encroachment by white settlers, bordered the Pit and Feather rivers. They were nearly destroyed during the California genocide in the latter half of the 19th century. The Central and Southern Yana continue to live in California as members of Redding Rancheria.

Etymology
The Yana-speaking people comprise four groups: the North Yana, the Central Yana, the Southern Yana, and the Yahi, of which two - the Central and Southern - remain. The noun stem Ya- means "person"; the noun suffix is -na in the northern Yana dialects and -hi [xi] in the southern dialects.

History

Anthropologist Alfred L. Kroeber put the 1770 population of the Yana at 1,500, and Sherburne F. Cook estimated their numbers at 1,900 and 1,850. Other estimates of the total Yana population before the Gold Rush exceed 3,000. They lived on wild game, salmon, fruit, acorns and roots. 

Their territory was approximately 2,400 square miles, or more than 6,000 km2, and contained mountain streams, gorges, boulder-strewn hills, and lush meadows. Each group had relatively distinct boundaries, dialects and customs.

Yahi
The Yahi were the southernmost portion of the Yana. They were hunter-gatherers who lived in small egalitarian bands without centralized political authority, were reclusive and fiercely defended their territory of mountain canyons. The Yahi initially numbered around 400.

The Yahi were the first Yana group to suffer from the Californian Gold Rush, for their lands were the closest to the gold fields. They suffered great population losses from the loss of their traditional food supplies and fought with the settlers over territory. They lacked firearms, and armed white settlers intentionally committed genocide against them in multiple raids. These raids took place as part of the California Genocide, during which the U.S. Army and vigilante militias carried out killings as well as the relocation of thousands of indigenous peoples in California. Settlers were led by Robert Anderson, whose men launched two raids in 1865 which killed a total of about 70 people. The massacre reduced the Yahi, who were already suffering from starvation, to a population of less than 100.

On August 6, 1865, seventeen settlers raided a Yahi village at dawn. In 1866, more Yahis were massacred when they were caught by surprise in a ravine. Circa 1867, 33 Yahis were killed after being tracked to a cave north of Mill Creek. Circa 1871, four cowboys trapped and killed about 30 Yahis in Kingsley cave.

Ishi

The last known survivor of the Yahi was named Ishi by American anthropologists. Ishi had spent most of his life hiding with his tribe members in the Sierra wilderness, emerging at the age of about 49, after the deaths of his mother and remaining relatives. He was the only Yahi known to Americans. Ishi emerged from the mountains near Oroville, California, on August 29, 1911, having lived his entire life outside of the American culture.

Professors from the University of California, Berkeley, read about him and brought him to San Francisco both for study and for his protection. Called the "last wild Indian", he had been treated as a curiosity by the public. Under the auspices of anthropologist Alfred Kroeber, director of the Museum of Anthropology, Ishi lived there until his death from tuberculosis (then incurable) in 1916. His language was studied in 1911 by linguist Edward Sapir, who had previously done work on the northern dialects.

By tribal custom, he was not to reveal his name to an enemy. Rather, one would be introduced by a friend, and then the name could be offered. Given that he was the last of his people, he had no friends, although he made some later at the University of California. Tradition demanded that he never speak his name. Researchers at the University of California, Berkeley gave him the name Ishi, the Yana word for "man". He accepted this and adopted the term "Mr. Ishi" when he learned enough English. Ishi worked as a research assistant at the Museum of Anthropology. He taught Saxton Pope, a professor at the medical school and his physician, how to make arrows and bows, and to hunt with them. Pope is considered the "father" of modern bowhunting, as he published extensively on techniques.

See also
 Yana language
 Yana traditional narratives
 Indigenous peoples of California

Notes

References
 Cook, Sherburne F. 1976a. The Conflict Between the California Indian and White Civilization. University of California Press, Berkeley.
 Cook, Sherburne F. 1976b. The Population of the California Indians, 1769–1970. University of California Press, Berkeley.
 Heizer, Robert F., and Theodora Kroeber (editors). 1979. Ishi the Last Yahi: A Documentary History. University of California Press, Berkeley.
 Johnson, Jerald Jay. 1978. "Yana" in Handbook of North American Indians, vol. 8 (California), pp. 361–369. Robert F. Heizer, ed. (William C. Sturtevant, general ed.) Washington, D.C.: Smithsonian Institution. /.
 Kroeber, A. L. 1925. Handbook of the Indians of California. Bureau of American Ethnology Bulletin No. 78. Washington, D.C.
 Kroeber, Theodora. 1961. Ishi in Two Worlds: A Biography of the Last Wild Indian in North America. University of California Press, Berkeley.
 Sapir, Edward (1910). "Yana Texts", University of California Publications in American Archaeology and Ethnology, vol. 1, no. 9. Berkeley: University Press.

External links
Ishi: The Last Yahi (1992), documentary, IMDB
, Overland Monthly Journal, 1875, online at University of Michigan
Map: "Native Tribes, Groups, Language Families, and Dialects of California region in 1770", California Prehistory

 
Native American tribes in California
History of the Sierra Nevada (United States)